The Peak to Peak Scenic Byway is a  National Forest Scenic Byway and Colorado Scenic and Historic Byway located in Gilpin, Boulder, Larimer counties, Colorado, USA. The Peak to Peak Highway was originally built in 1918 and provides views of the Front Range mountains in the Colorado Rocky Mountains. It was Colorado's first scenic highway. The Central City/Black Hawk Historic District is a National Historic Landmark.

The Peak to Peak Highway connects to the Trail Ridge Road/Beaver Meadow National Scenic Byway at Estes Park.

Route

Parks & Recreation Areas
Rocky Mountain National Park
Golden Gate Canyon State Park
Arapaho National Forest
Roosevelt National Forest
Indian Peaks Wilderness

Mountain peaks
Mount Flora
Mount Eva
Mount Epworth
Mount Jasper
Apache Peak
Mount Audubon 
Meadow Mountain
Copeland Mountain
Mount Meeker 
Longs Peak 
Twin Sisters Peaks

Gallery

See also

History Colorado
List of scenic byways in Colorado
Scenic byways in the United States

Notes

References

External links

America's Scenic Byways: Colorado
Colorado Department of Transportation
Colorado Scenic & Historic Byways Commission
Colorado Scenic & Historic Byways
Colorado Travel Map
Colorado Tourism Office
History Colorado
National Forest Scenic Byways

Colorado Scenic and Historic Byways
National Forest Scenic Byways
National Forest Scenic Byways in Colorado
Roosevelt National Forest
Transportation in Colorado
Transportation in Boulder County, Colorado
Transportation in Gilpin County, Colorado
Transportation in Larimer County, Colorado
Tourist attractions in Colorado
Tourist attractions in Boulder County, Colorado
Tourist attractions in Gilpin County, Colorado
Tourist attractions in Larimer County, Colorado
U.S. Route 34
U.S. Route 36